Hoseynabad-e Jadid (also Romanized as Ḩoseynābād-e Jadīd; also known as Ḩoseynābād) is a village in Fazl Rural District, in the Central District of Nishapur County, Razavi Khorasan Province, Iran. At the 2006 census, its population was 237, in 69 families.

References 

Populated places in Nishapur County